Chinese fried rice is a family of fried rice dishes popular in Greater China and around the world. It is sometimes served as the penultimate dish in Chinese banquets, just before dessert.

History

The earliest record of fried rice is found in the Sui dynasty (589–618 CE). Though the stir-frying technique used for fried rice was recorded in a much earlier period, it was only in the late Ming dynasty (1368–1644 CE) that the technique became widely popular.

Fried rice is believed to have started as a way to accommodate leftovers. Traditionally, Southern Chinese prefer their rice polished and plain, as a base staple to eat with meat and vegetables. The vegetables, meat and rice leftovers from the day before—which have passed their prime but are still good to consume, and too good to be fed to animals—are seasoned with soy sauce, lard and garlic, and stir-fried, making a hot meal.

The basic elements of Chinese fried rice include rice, meat and vegetables, soy sauce and garlic. A number of fried rice recipes have been developed in China, such as Yangzhou and Sichuan fried rice. Leftover cooked rice among the Cantonese is commonly made into fried rice, prepared with chopped vegetables and meat. It is believed that the basic stir-fried technique to cook fried rice, which required Chinese wok, spread from Southern China to other rice farming cultures in East and Southeast Asia.

Ingredients and preparation

The basic elements of Chinese fried rice are cooked rice, meat, and vegetables mixed with egg, soy sauce and garlic for flavour and seasoning, also cooking oil for greasing; either using lard, vegetable oil or sesame oil. The oil and soy sauce grease and coat the rice grains,  thus preventing them from burning and sticking to the cooking vessel. Sometimes chopped scallion, ginger, chili pepper and mushroom, also diced processed pork are added into the mixture. All ingredients are stir-fried on a strong fire using a Chinese wok cooking vessel, and the rice is turned, stirred and agitated using a spatula to evenly cook the rice and distribute the seasoning. Leftover rice is commonly used, and the dish can incorporate other leftover ingredients as well.

Variants

The main ingredients of basic Chinese fried rice are cooked rice, stir-fried with chopped vegetables and meat, seasoned with soy sauce and garlic. Started as a humble and simple way to cook leftovers, initially there is no single exact recipe of fried rice in Chinese cuisine tradition, since any different leftovers and additional ingredients could lead to another different recipe of fried rice. Each household might have its own way in cooking fried rice, which might led to myriad variants. Varieties differs in its contents, seasonings, spices, also vegetables and meat being used. This versatility and its economic value to save food has led to the popularity of stir-fried rice in China.

Today, many recipes of Chinese fried rice exist. This includes regional varieties such as Yangzhou fried rice (Yángzhōu chǎofàn) from Yangzhou,  Hokkien fried rice (Fuk1gin3 caau2faan6) from Fujian, and spicy Sichuan fried rice from Sichuan. Sichuan fried rice is notable for its tangy, hot and spicy flavour owed to doubanjiang chili sauce mixed with garlic, green and red onion.

Chinese fried rice dishes also spread to other parts of the world. The stir-fried technique that requires the use of Chinese wok, also the use of soy sauce as a seasoning in fried rice, clearly demonstrate Chinese cuisine influence. These cooking elements has spread to neighboring East Asian countries, the Southeast Asian region, and subsequently, the rest of the world. For example, Japanese chāhan originated from the fried rice made by Chinese immigrants in the 19th century. Despite having distinctly stronger flavour, Indonesian nasi goreng is also believed initially was influenced by Chinese fried rice.

Latin American countries also have their versions of Chinese fried rice since long ago, such as arroz chaufa (Peruvian-Chinese fried rice) and arroz frito (Cuban-Chinese fried rice). Indian pulao is also influenced by Chinese fried rice.

Outside China

Chinese fried rice is often a common staple in American Chinese cuisine, especially in the form sold as fast food. The most common form of American Chinese fried rice consists of some mixture of eggs, scallions, and vegetables, with chopped meat added at the customer's discretion, and usually flavored with soy sauce instead of table salt (more typical for Chinese-style fried rice). Sometimes chop suey-fried rice combo is offered in Chinese restaurant in the United States.

One of the most popular variations of fried rice in America is in Peru where it is prepared under the name "Arroz Chaufa" and is one of the best-known dishes in Chifa restaurants.

The dish is also a staple of Chinese restaurants in the United Kingdom (both "sit-in" and "takeaway"), and is very popular in the West African nations of Nigeria, Ghana and Togo, both as restaurant and as street food.

In Korea, the Korean Chinese-style fried rice is a separate genre of fried rice that differs from Korean-style fried rice dishes.

McDonald's serves McChao, a Chinese fried rice dish named after chǎofàn, which means "fried rice" in Chinese.

In the medical world 
Bacillus cereus poisoning is called "Chinese fried rice syndrome" due to its historical tie with the fried rice dishes.

Gallery

See also

 List of fried rice dishes

References 

Chinese rice dishes
Fried rice
National dishes